Karel Hardeman (29 June 1914 – 5 October 2010) was a Dutch rower. He competed in the men's coxed pair event at the 1936 Summer Olympics.

References

1914 births
2010 deaths
Dutch male rowers
Olympic rowers of the Netherlands
Rowers at the 1936 Summer Olympics
Sportspeople from Surabaya